This is a list of schools in the London Borough of Ealing, England.

State-funded schools

Primary schools 

Acton Gardens Primary School, Acton
Alec Reed Academy, Northolt
Allenby Primary School, Southall
Ark Byron Primary Academy, Acton
Ark Priory Primary Academy, Acton
Beaconsfield Primary School, Southall
Blair Peach Primary School, Southall
Brentside Primary Academy, Hanwell
Christ the Saviour CE Primary School, Ealing
Clifton Primary School, Southall
Coston Primary School, Greenford
Dairy Meadow Primary School, Southall
Derwentwater Primary School, Acton
Dormers Wells Infant School, Southall
Dormers Wells Junior School, Southall
Downe Manor Primary School, Northolt
Drayton Green Primary School, Ealing
Durdans Park Primary School, Southall
East Acton Primary School, Acton
Edward Betham CE Primary School, Greenford
Featherstone Primary School, Southall
Fielding Primary School, Ealing
Gifford Primary School, Northolt
Grange Primary School, Ealing
Greenwood Primary School, Northolt
Hambrough Primary School, Southall
Havelock Primary School Southall
Hobbayne Primary School, Hanwell
Holy Family RC Primary School, Acton
Horsenden Primary School, Greenford
John Perryn Primary School, Acton
Khalsa Primary School, Southall
Lady Margaret Primary School, Southall
Little Ealing Primary School, Ealing
Mayfield Primary School, Hanwell
Montpelier Primary School, Ealing
Mount Carmel RC Primary School, Ealing
North Ealing Primary School, Ealing
North Primary School, Southall
Oaklands Primary School, Hanwell
Oldfield Primary School, Greenford
Our Lady of The Visitation RC Primary School, Greenford
Perivale Primary School, Greenford
Petts Hill Primary School, Northolt
Ravenor Primary School, Greenford
St Anselm's RC Primary School, Southall
St Gregory's RC Primary School, Ealing
St John Fisher RC Primary School, Greenford
St John's Primary School, Ealing
St Joseph's RC Primary School, Ealing
St Marks Primary School, Hanwell
St Marys CE Primary School, Norwood Green
St Raphael's RC Primary School, Northolt
St Vincent's RC Primary School, Acton
Selborne Primary School, Greenford
Southfield Primary School, Chiswick
Stanhope Primary School, Greenford
Three Bridges Primary School, Norwood Green
Tudor Primary School, Southall
Vicar's Green Primary School, Perivale
Viking Primary School, Northolt
West Acton Primary School, Acton
West Twyford Primary School, Acton
Willow Tree Primary School Northolt
Wolf Fields Primary School, Norwood Green
Wood End Primary School, Northolt
Woodlands Academy, Ealing

Secondary schools 

Ada Lovelace CE High School, Greenford
Alec Reed Academy, Northolt
Ark Acton Academy, Acton
Ark Soane Academy, Acton
Brentside High School, Hanwell
The Cardinal Wiseman Catholic School, Greenford
Dormers Wells High School, Southall
Drayton Manor High School, Hanwell
Ealing Fields High School, Hanwell 
The Ellen Wilkinson School for Girls, Acton
Elthorne Park High School, Hanwell
Featherstone High School, Southall
Greenford High School, Greenford
Northolt High School, Northolt
Twyford Church of England High School, Acton
Villiers High School, Southall
William Perkin Church of England High School, Greenford

Special and alternative schools 

Belvue School, Northolt
Castlebar School, Ealing
Ealing Alternative Provision, Ealing
Ealing Primary Centre, Greenford
John Chilton School, Northolt
Mandeville School, Greenford
St Ann's School, Hanwell
Springhallow School, Ealing

Further education 
Ealing, Hammersmith and West London College

Independent schools

Primary and preparatory schools 

Avenue House School, Ealing
Clifton Lodge School, Ealing
Durston House, Ealing
Greek Primary School of London, Acton
Harvington School, Ealing
La Chouette School, Ealing
London Welsh School, Hanwell
Orchard House School, Chiswick

Senior and all-through schools 

Ayesha Siddiqa Girls School, Southall
Ealing Independent College, Ealing
The Eden School, Hanwell
Japanese School in London, Acton
King Fahad Academy, Acton
Notting Hill & Ealing High School, Ealing
St Augustine's Priory School, Ealing
St Benedict's School, Ealing

Special and alternative schools 
Blooming Tree Pre Prep School, Acton
Blooming Tree Primary School, Ealing
Insights Independent School, West Ealing
North West London Independent Special School, East Acton
Seva Special School, West Ealing
The Sybil Elgar School, Southall

Ealing
Schools in the London Borough of Ealing